Teun Sebastián Ángel Wilke Braams (born 14 March 2002) is a Mexican professional footballer who plays as an attacking midfielder and forward for Belgian Pro League club Cercle Brugge, on loan from Serie B club S.P.A.L.

Club career

Early career
After a couple of years in Gallos Blancos de Querétaro academy, Wilke joined Heerenveen youth academy in 2018. He then briefly transferred to S.P.A.L. in 2021.

Cercle Brugge (loan)
On 20 August 2022, Wilke joined Jupiler Pro League club Cercle Brugge on a season-long loan. On 27 August 2022, he made his professional debut in a league match against Zulte Waregem in a 1–1 draw, coming on as a substitute. After three late-substitute appearances for the main squad, he was moved to the reserve squad Jong Cercle which plays in the fourth-tier Belgian Division 2.

International career
Wilke was called up by Raúl Chabrand to participate with the under-21 team at the 2022 Maurice Revello Tournament, where Mexico finished the tournament in third place.

Personal life
Born in Mexico to Dutch parents, Wilke holds a Dutch and Mexican citizenship.

Career statistics

Club

References

External links
 
 

2002 births
Footballers from Querétaro
Sportspeople from Querétaro City
Living people
Mexican footballers
Mexico youth international footballers
Association football midfielders
Cercle Brugge K.S.V. players
S.P.A.L. players
Serie B players
Belgian Pro League players
Mexican expatriate footballers
Expatriate footballers in Italy
Mexican expatriate sportspeople in Italy
Expatriate footballers in Belgium
Mexican expatriate sportspeople in Belgium